Julia Voitovitsch (born 8 December 1976) is a German swimmer. She competed in the women's 100 metre butterfly event at the 1996 Summer Olympics.

References

External links
 

1976 births
Living people
German female swimmers
Olympic swimmers of Germany
Swimmers at the 1996 Summer Olympics
Sportspeople from Kyiv